DOS-2 designation given to a space station, launched as part of the Salyut programme, which was lost in a launch failure on 29 July 1972, when the failure of the second stage of its Proton-K launch vehicle prevented the station from achieving orbit. It instead fell into the Pacific Ocean. The station, which would have been given the designation Salyut 2 had it reached orbit, was structurally identical to Salyut 1, as it had been assembled as a backup unit for that station. Four teams of cosmonauts were formed to crew the station, of which two would have flown:
Alexei Leonov and Valeri Kubasov
Vasily Lazarev and Oleg Makarov
Aleksei Gubarev and Georgi Grechko
Pyotr Klimuk and Vitaly Sevastyanov
Whilst Salyut 1 has been attempted to be visited by two three-person crews (Soyuz 10 and Soyuz 11), following modifications to the Soyuz 7KT-OK spacecraft (resulting in the new model Soyuz 7K-T) following the deaths of the crew of Soyuz 11, the spacecraft could only carry two cosmonauts, thus DOS-2 would have had two crews of two. Following the loss of the station, the crews were transferred to the DOS-3 programme.

References

Salyut program
Space stations
Satellite launch failures
1972 in the Soviet Union
Spacecraft launched in 1972
Rocket launches in 1972